Ben Flynn may refer to:

Ben Eine (real name Ben Flynn born 1970), prolific street artist
Ben Flynn (True Blood), fictional character
Ben Flynn, character in Sharks' Treasure